Veryan Weston (born 1950) is a British pianist active in free improvisation, jazz, and rock music. He has worked with Lol Coxhill, Eddie Prévost, Trevor Watts, Caroline Kraabel and Phil Minton.

Weston was born in 1950 and lived in Cornwall before moving to London in 1972.

Discography
 Underwater Carol (Matchless, 1987)
 Playing Alone (Acta, 1997)
 Mercury Concert (Emanem, 1999)
 Unearthed (33 Records, 1999)
 Five Shadows (Emanem, 2001)
 Tessellations for Lutheal Piano (Emanem, 2003)
 Gateway to Vienna (Emanem, 2005)
 Unlocked (Emanem, 2007)
 Allusions (Emanem, 2009)
 Different Tessellations (Emanem, 2011)
 Haste (Emanem, 2012)
 Dialogues for Ornette! (FMR, 2015)
 Tuning Out (Emanem, 2015)
 Discoveries On Tracker Action Organs (Emanem, 2016)
 The Make Project (Barnyard, 2018)
 Crossings (Hi 4Head, 2020)

As sideman
With Lol Coxhill
 The Joy of Paranoia (Ogun, 1978)
 Digswell Duets (Random Radar, 1979)
 Cou$cou$ (Nato, 1984)
 The Inimitable (Chabada, 1985)
 Frog Dance (Impetus, 1986)
 Boundless (Emanem, 1998)
 Coxhill On Ogun (Ogun, 1998)
 Spectral Soprano (Emanem, 2002)
 Worms Organising Archdukes (Emanem, 2002)
 Out to Launch (Emanem, 2003)

With Phil Minton
 Ways (ITM, 1987)
 Ways Past (ITM, 1992)
 Songs from a Prison Diary (Leo, 1993)
 Mouthfull of Ecstasy (Victo, 1996)
 Ways Out East, Ways Out West (Intakt, 2005)
 Slur (Emanem, 2007)

With Trevor Watts
 Trevor Watts' Moire Music (Arc, 1985)
 Saalfelden Encore (Cadillac, 1987)
 With One Voice (Arc, 1988)
 6 Dialogues (Emanem, 2002)
 5 More Dialogues (Emanem, 2011)
 Dialogues in Two Places (Hi 4 Head, 2012)
 At Ad Libitum (for Tune, 2015)
 Dialogues with Strings (Fundacja Suchaj, 2017)
 The Real Intention (Fundacja Suchaj, 2020)

With others
 Steve Beresford, 3 Pianos (Emanem, 2001)
 Caroline Kraabel, Playtime (Mass Producers, 2009)
 Caroline Kraabel, Last1 and Last2 (Emanem, 2019)
 Eddie Prevost, Continuum (Matchless, 1985)
 Jon Rose, Temperament (Emanem, 2002)
 Jon Rose, Tunings & Tunes (HEyeRMEarS/Discorbie 2010)
 Paul Rutherford, In Backward Times (Emanem, 2017)
 Ian Smith, Daybreak (Emanem, 2001)

References

External links
Official site

1950 births
Living people
Musicians from London
Avant-garde jazz musicians
British experimental musicians
Emanem Records artists
FMR Records artists